Pseudomonas meridiana is a psychrophilic, Gram-negative, motile with a polar flagellum, rod-shaped bacterium isolated from cyanobacterial mats in Antarctica.

References

External links
Type strain of Pseudomonas meridiana at BacDive -  the Bacterial Diversity Metadatabase

Pseudomonadales
Bacteria described in 2004